Patrukova is a rural locality (a village) in Oshibskoye Rural Settlement, Kudymkarsky District, Perm Krai, Russia. The population was 106 as of 2010. There are 3 streets.

Geography 
Patrukova is located 37 km northeast of Kudymkar (the district's administrative centre) by road. Petukhova is the nearest rural locality.

References 

Rural localities in Kudymkarsky District